Kazeem Nosiru (born 25 November 1974 in Lagos) is a Nigerian table tennis player. He shared a bronze medal triumph with Egypt's El-sayed Lashin in the men's singles at the 2007 All-Africa Games in Algiers, Algeria. As of September 2012, Nosiru is ranked no. 269 in the world by the International Table Tennis Federation (ITTF). He is a member of Lascala Sports Club in Barcelona, Spain, and is coached and trained by Obisanya Babatunde. Nosiru is also right-handed, and uses the attacking grip.

Nosiru made his official debut at the 2000 Summer Olympics in Sydney, where he competed only in the men's doubles. Playing with his partner and Olympic veteran Segun Toriola, Nosiru placed second in the preliminary pool round against the Netherlands' Trinko Keen and Danny Heister, and India's Chetan Baboor and Raman Subramanyam, with a total of 119 winning points, three games, and a single victory.

At the 2004 Summer Olympics in Athens, Nosiru teamed up with his new partner Peter Akinlabi in the men's doubles. The Nigerian duo defeated Chile's Juan Papic and Alejandro Rodríguez in the preliminary round, before losing out their next match to Danish pair Michael Maze and Finn Tugwell, with a set score of 2–4.

Eight years after competing in his first Olympics, Nosiru qualified for his third Nigerian team, as a 33-year-old, at the 2008 Summer Olympics in Beijing, by receiving a continental spot for Africa in the men's team under ITTF's Computer Team Ranking List. Nosiru joined with his fellow players Monday Merotohun and Segun Toriola for the inaugural men's team event. He and his team placed third in the preliminary pool round, earning a total of four points, two defeats (against Japan and Hong Kong), and a single defeat over the Russian team (led by Alexei Smirnov).

References

External links
 
 NBC Olympics Profile

1974 births
Living people
Nigerian male table tennis players
Table tennis players at the 2000 Summer Olympics
Table tennis players at the 2004 Summer Olympics
Table tennis players at the 2008 Summer Olympics
Olympic table tennis players of Nigeria
Sportspeople from Lagos
Commonwealth Games medallists in table tennis
Commonwealth Games silver medallists for Nigeria
Commonwealth Games bronze medallists for Nigeria
African Games silver medalists for Nigeria
African Games medalists in table tennis
African Games bronze medalists for Nigeria
Table tennis players at the 2002 Commonwealth Games
Table tennis players at the 2006 Commonwealth Games
Competitors at the 2007 All-Africa Games
Competitors at the 2011 All-Africa Games
20th-century Nigerian people
21st-century Nigerian people
Medallists at the 2002 Commonwealth Games